Ryan Peters may refer to:

 Ryan Peters (footballer) (born 1987), English footballer
 Ryan Peters (politician), American politician in New Jersey
 Ryan Peters (musician), Canadian singer-songwriter
 Spose (Ryan Michael Peters, born 1985), American rapper